The General Association of Koreans in China is a pro-DPRK group of ethnic Koreans in the People's Republic of China. The organization is led by Chairwoman Choe Un-bok and held its sixth congress in Shenyang, China, on August 10, 2016. At that time it had been seven years since their fifth congress.

There are regional and branch organizations of the GAKC, including one in the Yanbian Korean Autonomous Prefecture. The regional chairman there, Cha Sang-bo, is the  vice-chairman of the General Association of Koreans in China.

They publish a magazine called Paektu-Halla.

The organization was apparently founded in 1991, based around a "Korean-Japanese headquarters" led by Chung Min Lee. It adopted its current name in 1998.

See also 
Chongryon (General Association of Korean Residents in Japan)

References

External links
  

Organizations established in 1991
1991 establishments in China
Korean diaspora in China
Diaspora organizations based in China